Lys Hansen (born 1936) is a Scottish artist regarded as one of the country's most important figurative expressionist painters. She currently lives and works in Braco, Perthshire.

Early life and education 
Hansen was born in Falkirk and grew up in Alloa. Hansen studied at Edinburgh College of Art from 1955 to 1959 before continuing to attend the University of Edinburgh where she studied fine art in 1961. After studying art, Hansen trained as a teacher. She has travelled and worked across Europe, including to France, the Netherlands, Ireland, Germany and Denmark.

Career 
Hansen was working in Berlin when the Berlin Wall came down, greatly impacting her creative direction. Her work is often considered introspective and challenging. Often working in paint, Hansen explores the human condition in her work. Having previously exhibited her paintings, Hansen exhibited her drawings for the first time in 2012. A sculpture in wood by Hansen formed part of an exhibition at the Kunsthuis Gallery, Yorkshire, in 2016.

Hansen is recognised for her work in supporting other artists. Her work has also inspired the poem Warpaint And Womanflesh by Scottish writer and Scots Makar, Liz Lochhead.

Hansen was the subject of the book, Passionate Paint: The Art of Lys Hansen, published by Mainstream Publishing Ltd in 1998.

Hansen is a past president and current member of the Society of Scottish Artists.

Selected exhibitions 

Lys Hansen Solo, Third Eye Centre, Glasgow, February 1984
 Camden Arts Centre, 1986
 Relatively Close, Bornholm Kunst Museum, Denmark, 2007
 The Other Side: Karin Christiansen and Lys Hansen, Collins Gallery, University Of Strathclyde, 8 July–16 August 2008
 Relatively Closer, University of Stirling, Scotland, 2009
Drawing Breath, Cooper Gallery, University of Dundee, 2–30 March 2012
When You Reach September, Kinblethmont Gallery, Arbroath, 2012
Love + War + Paint, The Lillie Art Gallery, Milngavie, 12 July–24 September 2014

Selected awards and recognition 

 Post-graduate scholarship, Edinburgh College of Art
 Scottish Arts Council scholarship awarded in 1985
 Abbey Minor Award, Prix de Rome, British School at Rome
 President of the Society of Scottish Artists, 1992–1995

Works in public collections 
Pieces by Hansen are held in several public collections, including the following works,

References

External links 
 Artworks by Lys Hansen on Art UK
 A list of articles written by Clare Henry, referencing several exhibitions that include Hansen

1936 births
Living people
20th-century Scottish women artists
21st-century Scottish women artists
Alumni of the Edinburgh College of Art
Alumni of the University of Edinburgh
Figurative Abstraction
People from Falkirk
Presidents of the Society of Scottish Artists